Pétanque at the 2009 Southeast Asian Games took place at National University of Lao Petanque Court, Dongdok (Vientiane), Laos.

Medalists

Men

Women

Mixed

Medal tally

References

Sources 
 https://issuu.com/manolimpik/docs/medallist_laos2009
 https://web.archive.org/web/20161220094936/http://www.seagfoffice.org/pdf/pdf_1450241543_139.pdf
 http://www.seagfoffice.org/pdf/pdf_1450240804_199.pdf
 http://wikimapia.org/12988382/25th-SEA-Games-Laos-Vientiane-2009-Petanque-Court-National-University-of-Lao-Dongdok
 https://www.youtube.com/watch?v=uPxATbJdnL4
 https://www.youtube.com/watch?v=xz1supmGnoo
 https://www.youtube.com/watch?v=RDuLsp0etdU
 http://www.phnompenhpost.com/sport/sea-games-medalists-return
 http://www.phnompenhpost.com/sport/mixed-fortunes-25th-sea-games
 http://en.baomoi.com/Info/Vietnam-now-in-1st-place-at-SEA-Games/10/27744.epi

External links 
 Southeast Asian Games Official Results

2009 Southeast Asian Games events
Pétanque at the Southeast Asian Games